The 2006–07 Vyshcha Liha season is the sixteenth since its establishment. Shakhtar Donetsk were the defending champions. Soyuz-Viktan became the first title sponsor in the League's history.

The season started on July 21, 2006 with the game in Kyiv, Dynamo - Chornomorets 4:1. The last day of the competition was June 17, 2007. The winner of the championship was declared Dynamo Kyiv acquiring their 12th title  defeating the reigning champion Shakhtar Donetsk that was holding the title for the last couple of years.

Illichivets was forced into relegation for the first time since entering the League 10 years ago. Stal was relegated as well. It was the second time for that club.

The game Karpaty-Metalist finished with a technical loss awarded to the Lviv's club for no appearance.

Teams

Promoted
FC Zorya Luhansk, champion of the 2005-06 Ukrainian First League – (returning after absence of 10 seasons)
FC Karpaty Lviv, runner-up of the 2005-06 Ukrainian First League – (returning after absence of 2 seasons)

Location map

Managers

League table

Results

Top goal scorers

Stadia

Auxiliary or former home stadiums

See also
 2006–07 Ukrainian First League
 2006–07 Ukrainian Second League
 2006–07 Ukrainian Cup

References

External links
Website of FFU
ukranianfootball.narod.ru

Ukrainian Premier League seasons
1
Ukra